Lindsley Parsons (1905–1992) was an American film producer and screenwriter. He worked throughout his career at the low-budget Monogram Pictures and its successor, Allied Artists. He generally produced cheap gangster, action and Western films. He was the father of film producer Lindsley Parsons Jr.

Selected filmography

Producer

 Frontier Town (1938)
 The Gang's All Here (1941)
 King of the Zombies (1941)
 Campus Rhythm (1943)
The Crime Smasher (1943)
 Detective Kitty O'Day (1944)
 Adventures of Kitty O'Day (1945)
 South of the Rio Grande (1945)
 The Lonesome Trail (1945)
Ginger (1946)
 Louisiana (1947)
 Tuna Clipper (1949)
 The Wolf Hunters (1949)
 Trail of the Yukon (1949)
 Call of the Klondike (1950)
 Snow Dog (1950)
 Yukon Manhunt (1951)
 Northwest Territory (1951)
 Fangs of the Arctic (1953)
 Tangier Incident (1953)
 Mexican Manhunt (1953)
 Northern Patrol (1953)
 Jack Slade (1953)
 Dragoon Wells Massacre (1957)

Screenwriter
 The Man from Utah (1934) starring John Wayne and George "Gabby" Hayes
 The Trail Beyond (1934) starring John Wayne, Noah Beery Sr. and Noah Beery Jr.
 The Desert Trail (1935) starring John Wayne
 Trouble in Texas (1937) starring Tex Ritter and Rita Hayworth (original story by Lindsley Parsons)

References

Bibliography 
 Ashdown, Paul & Caudill, Edward, The Mosby Myth: A Confederate Hero in Life and Legend. Rowman & Littlefield, 2002.

External links 
 

1905 births
1992 deaths
American male screenwriters
Writers from Tacoma, Washington
20th-century American businesspeople
Screenwriters from Washington (state)
Film producers from Washington (state)
20th-century American male writers
20th-century American screenwriters